Beoga (Irish word for vivid or lively) are an Irish folk band. They were formed in County Kerry in 2002 at the All-Ireland Fleadh although the original four members of the band hail from County Antrim and County Londonderry in Northern Ireland. The line-up features Damian McKee on accordion, multi-instrumentalist Seán Óg Graham, pianist Liam Bradley and Eamon Murray on bodhrán. Niamh Dunne, from County Limerick, joined in 2005, on vocals and fiddle.

History
Their 2007 album mischief was voted one of the top folk albums of 2007 at the Live Ireland Music Awards and the German Music Awards. Their third album, the incident, was shortlisted  for a 2010 Grammy Award nomination, in the Best Contemporary World Music Album category. In that year they were awarded a U.S. House of Representatives Certificate of Congressional Recognition and were described by The Wall Street Journal as "the most exciting traditional band to emerge from Ireland this century."

In 2016 Ed Sheeran invited Beoga to contribute to his album ÷ (divide). They co-wrote the song "Galway Girl" using parts of the track "Minute 5" from their album how to tune a fish. They are also featured on the song "Nancy Mulligan".

On 25 June 2017 the band backed Sheeran for a performance of "Nancy Mulligan" during his headline performance at Glastonbury Festival 2017.

The "mini-album" Carousel released in May 2020 shows a style change towards pop-music. A strong influence are the guest musicians fearured on the tracks. In April 2021 the Band released five instrumental tracks on the EP Breathe. On this EP they mix the structures of traditional Irish tunes with elements of pop-music.

Gallery

Discography
 A Lovely Madness (2004)
 Mischief (2007)
 The Incident (2009)
 Live at Stockfisch Studio (2010)
 How to Tune a Fish (2011)
 Beoga – Live at 10: The 10th Anniversary Concert (2013)
 Before We Change Our Mind (2016)
 Carousel (2020)
 Breathe (2021)

References

External links

Beoga: Official website

Celtic music groups
Folk music groups from Northern Ireland
Musical groups established in 2002